The Grällsta Runestone, listed as Västmanland Runic Inscription 27 or Vs 27 in the Rundata catalog, is a Viking Age memorial runestone located in Grällsta, which is about nine kilometers northeast of Ransta, Västmanland County, Sweden, which was in the historic province of Västmanland. A second runestone that has been designated as Västmanland Runic Inscription 28 or Vs 28 was once located in Grällsta, but it is now considered to be lost.

Description
The inscription on Vs 27 consists of runic text in the younger futhark on a serpent that encircles a cross. The inscription, which is 1.75 meters in height and on a granite stone, is classified as probably being carved in runestone style Pr5, which is also known as Urnes style. This runestone style is characterized by slim and stylized animals that are interwoven into tight patterns. The animal heads are typically seen in profile with slender almond-shaped eyes and upwardly curled appendages on the noses and the necks. The inscription based on stylistic analysis is attributed to a runemaster with the normalized name of Litle, who signed the inscriptions on inscription Vs 20 in Prästgården (Romfartuna synod) and possibly Vs 28. Other inscriptions attributed to Litle based on stylistic analysis include Vs 17 in Råby, Vs 22 in Ulvsta, and Vs 32 in Prästgården (Västerfärnebo synod).

The runic text states that the stone was raised by two brothers named Þorbjôrn and Ingifastr in memory of their father Sigþorn, who is stated as having died while on a voyage. This runestone belongs to a group of inscriptions that make a public announcement of a death that occurred while traveling, perhaps to allow property to be distributed as inheritance. Other inscriptions making such a general statement of a non-local death include Sö 49 in Ene, Sö 217 in Berga, Sm 48 in Torp, U 258 in Fresta, the now-lost U 349 in Odenslunda, the now-lost U 363 in Gådersta, U 948 in Danmarks, Vs 22 in Ulvsta, Nä 29 in Apelboda, DR 330 in Gårdstånga, and DR 379 in Ny Larsker. It has been suggested that the joint listing of the brothers may indicate that they held the inheritance from their father jointly and without dividing it into separate households.

Inscription

Transliteration of the runes into Latin characters
þurbiorn ok : ikifastr : lit * resa : ytiʀ ¤ sihþorn × faþur : sin × hon ×  toþr × [i] faru × litli × risti × runiʀ

Transcription into Old Norse
Þorbiorn ok Ingifastr letu ræisa æftiʀ Sigþorn, faður sinn. Hann [varð] dauðr i faru. Litli risti runiʀ.

Translation in English
Þorbjôrn and Ingifastr had (the stone) raised in memory of Sigþorn, their father. He died on a voyage. Litli carved the runes.

Vs 28
A second runestone was noted as being located in Grällsta, but it has been considered to be lost since around 1800. The inscription has been given the Rundata listing of Vs 28 and is considered to have been a runestone fragment. Records indicate that the damaged text stated that someone ordered a bridge to be constructed. Vs is believed to also have been carved by the runemaster Litle.

Inscription

Transliteration of the runes into Latin characters
[...--eʀ * baþ : bru kera : r... ...-ʀi]

Transcription into Old Norse
... bað bro gærva ... ...

Translation in English
... ordered the bridge be made ... ...

References

External links
 Photograph of Vs 27 in 2005

Runestones in Västmanland